Xiao Yanling (born 27 April 1968) is a Chinese discus thrower. Her personal best throw was 71.68 metres, achieved in March 1992 in Beijing. This is the current Asian record. She failed a drug test in 1992.

She won the gold medal at the 1991 Summer Universiade and the bronze medal at the 1998 Asian Championships.

Achievements

References

1968 births
Living people
Chinese female discus throwers
Doping cases in athletics
Universiade medalists in athletics (track and field)
Universiade gold medalists for China
Medalists at the 1991 Summer Universiade
20th-century Chinese women